Felipe Novoa Cianelli (born April 28, 1984 in Santiago) is a Chilean judoka, who played for the half-lightweight category. He won a bronze medal for his division at the 2005 Pan American Judo Championships in Caguas, Puerto Rico, and added three more titles to his collection from the South American Championships. Novoa is also the son of Eduardo Novoa, who competed in the men's middleweight class at the 1984 Summer Olympics in Los Angeles, California.

Novoa represented Chile at the 2008 Summer Olympics in Beijing, where he competed for the men's half-lightweight class (66 kg). He received a bye for the second preliminary round match, before losing out, by an ippon (full point) and an uchi mata (inner thigh throw), to Italy's Giovanni Casale.

References

External links

NBC Olympics Profile

Chilean male judoka
Living people
Olympic judoka of Chile
Judoka at the 2008 Summer Olympics
Sportspeople from Santiago
1984 births
South American Games bronze medalists for Chile
South American Games medalists in judo
Competitors at the 2006 South American Games
20th-century Chilean people
21st-century Chilean people